Simão de Almeida Neto (9 January 1944 – 29 December 2021) was a Brazilian politician.

Biography
A member of the Communist Party of Brazil, he served in the Legislative Assembly of Paraíba from 1991 to 1995. Almeida died from a hemorrhagic stroke related to the complications of COVID-19 in João Pessoa on 29 December 2021, at the age of 77.

References

1944 births
2021 deaths
20th-century Brazilian politicians
Communist Party of Brazil politicians
Members of the Legislative Assembly of Paraíba
People from João Pessoa, Paraíba
Deaths from the COVID-19 pandemic in Paraíba